Iberochondrostoma oretanum is a species of cyprinid fish endemic to Spain where it is found in the Robledillo and Fresnada rivers, tributaries of the Jándula (es) in the Guadalquivir system.

Its natural habitat is intermittent rivers.  It is threatened by habitat loss.

References 

Iberochondrostoma
Endemic fish of the Iberian Peninsula
Endemic fauna of Spain
Fish described in 2003
Taxonomy articles created by Polbot